Bertulania is a monotypic moth genus of the family Erebidae. Its only species, Bertulania corticea, is found in Cameroon. Both the genus and species were first described by Strand in 1904.

References

Endemic fauna of Cameroon
Calpinae
Monotypic moth genera